Jersson Vásquez Shapiama (born 5 March 1986) is a Peruvian footballer who plays primarily as a left back. He currently plays for César Vallejo in the Torneo Descentralizado.

Club career
Jersson Vasquez began his career with Sporting Cristal in 2004. He was part of the Cristal squad that finished as champions of the 2005 Torneo Descentralizado.

Then he had a short spell with Total Clean FBC in 2007. He made 11 appearances in his time with the Arequipa side.

In January 2008 he joined José Gálvez FBC.

References

External links

1986 births
Living people
Footballers from Lima
Association football fullbacks
Peruvian footballers
Sporting Cristal footballers
Total Chalaco footballers
José Gálvez FBC footballers
Juan Aurich footballers
Unión Comercio footballers
Club Deportivo Universidad de San Martín de Porres players
Deportivo Municipal footballers
Club Universitario de Deportes footballers
Club Deportivo Universidad César Vallejo footballers
Peruvian Primera División players